Plasticine is a putty-like modelling material made from calcium salts, petroleum jelly and aliphatic acids. Though originally a brand name for the British version of the product, it is now applied generically in English as a product category to other formulations. 

Plasticine is used for children's play and as a modelling medium for more formal or permanent structures.  Because of its non-drying property, it is a material commonly chosen for stop-motion animation, including several Oscar-winning films by Nick Park.

History 
Franz Kolb, owner of a pharmacy in Munich, Germany, invented an oil-based modelling clay in 1880. At the time, the city was a centre for the arts, and among Kolb's circle of friends were sculptors. They complained about how with the clay they were using for modelling, their sculptures would dry too fast and that — particularly in winter —, it was too difficult to work with. In order to commercialize his invention, he presented it to the Faber-Castell company in 1887, which had back then the name "Kunst-Modellierthon" (known as Plastilin), where it is still sold nowadays under the name "Münchner Künstler Plastilin" (Munich artists' Plastilin). In Italy, the product Pongo is also marketed as "plastilina" and shares the main attributes of Plasticine. Play-Doh, which is based on flour, salt and water, dries on exposure to air. In France, it is made by Herbin, and marketed as Plastiline. In Spain, toy manufacturer JOVI markets a product also branded "Plastilina", made from vegetable matter which makes it lighter.

William Harbutt, an art teacher in Bath, England, formulated Plasticine in 1897. Harbutt wanted a non-drying clay for his sculpture students. He created a non-toxic, sterile, soft and malleable clay that did not dry when exposed to air.

Harbutt received a patent in 1899 and commercial production started at a factory in Bathampton in 1900. The original Plasticine was grey, but four colours were produced for initial sales to the public. Plasticine was used by children and was often bought by schools for teaching art. It has found a wide variety of other uses (for example moulding casts for plaster, and plastics).

Plasticine is approximately 65% bulking agent (principally gypsum), 10% petroleum jelly, 5% lime, 10% lanolin and 10% stearic acid. It cannot be hardened by firing, melts when exposed to heat, and is flammable at higher temperatures.

Harbutt patented a different formulation in 1915, which added wool fibres to give plasticine a stronger composition intended for ear plugs, and as a sterile dressing for wounds and burns. The Harbutt company marketed Plasticine as a children's toy by producing modelling kits based on characters from children's stories, such as Noddy, the Mr. Men and Paddington Bear.

The original Plasticine factory was destroyed by fire in 1963 and replaced by a modern building. The Harbutt company produced Plasticine in Bathampton until 1983, when production was moved to Thailand.

The Colorforms company was the major American licensee of Plasticine from 1979 until at least 1984. The use of a different chalk compound caused a product inconsistency, and the U.S. version was considered inferior to the original mix.

Bluebird Toys plc acquired Plasticine through its purchase of Peter Pan, Harbutt's parent company. In 1998, Mattel bought Bluebird and the brand was sold to Humbrol Ltd, known for its model paints and owner of the Airfix model kit brand. Flair Leisure licensed the brand from Humbrol in 2005 and relaunched Plasticine. It acquired the brand outright, when Humbrol entered administration a year later.

Uses 

Plasticine and similar materials are used in clay animation. One of its main proponents is Aardman Animations' Nick Park, who used characters modelled in Plasticine in his four Oscar-winning Wallace and Gromit short films A Grand Day Out (1989), The Wrong Trousers (1993), A Close Shave (1995) and A Matter of Loaf and Death (2008), as well as the feature film The Curse of the Were-Rabbit (2005). This technique, a form of stop-motion animation, is known as claymation in the US.

Plasticine-like materials are appealing to animators because the material can be used with ease: it is mouldable enough to create a character, flexible enough to allow that character to move in many ways, and dense enough to retain its shape easily when combined with a wire armature, and does not melt under hot studio lighting.

Plasticine is used in long jump and triple jump competitions to help officials determine if the competitors are making legal jumps. A  'indicator board' is placed beyond and slightly above the take-off line. The edges of this are chamfered and edged with plasticine. If an athlete leaves a mark in the plasticine, it is considered proof that the jump was a foul, and the attempt is not measured. Plasticine is used rather than sand, so that several boards may be prepared in advance: if a board is marked it may be replaced by a smoothed board immediately to avoid delaying the competition, but keeping the marked board available in case of challenges. An indicator board is used, rather than a wide strip of plasticine, as this provides a firm footing should the athlete step on it.

Plasticine-like clays are also used in commercial party games such as Barbarossa.

Television presenter James May together with Chris Collins, Jane McAdam Freud, Julian Fullalove and around 2,000 members of the public created a show garden made entirely of Plasticine for the 2009 Chelsea Flower Show. Called "Paradise in Plasticine", it took 6 weeks and 2.6 tons of Plasticine in 24 colours to complete. May said, "This is, to our knowledge, the largest and most complex model of this type ever created." It couldn't be considered as part of the standard judging criteria as it contained no real plants, but was awarded an honorary gold award made from Plasticine. The garden won the Royal Horticultural Society's 'peoples choice' for best small garden.

During World War II, Plasticine was used by bomb disposal officer Major John P. Hudson R.E. as part of the defuzing process for the new German "Type Y" battery-powered bomb fuze. The "Type Y" fuze has an anti-disturbance device that had to be disabled before the fuze could be removed. Plasticine was used to build a dam around the head of the fuze to hold some liquid oxygen. The liquid oxygen cooled the battery down to a temperature at which it would no longer function; with the battery out of commission, the fuze could be removed safely.

Cultural impact 

The brand-name clay is sometimes mentioned in British music, such as the "plasticine porters" in The Beatles' "Lucy in the Sky with Diamonds",  the Oasis songs "Little James" and "Shakermaker", the Placebo song "Plasticine", the Charli XCX song "Bounce", the Thom Yorke song "Plasticine Figures", and the Tears for Fears song "Ladybird".

See also 

 Industrial plasticine
 Milliput
 Plastilina
 Sculpey
 Play-Doh

References

External links 

 Photos tagged plasticine on Flickr

Sculpture materials
English inventions